The 2021–22 FIS Alpine Ski Continental Cup (AOC) is a season of the FIS Alpine Ski Continental Cup, a series of second-level alpine skiing competitions arranged by the International Ski Federation (FIS).

Winners
The overall winners from the 2021–22 season's Continental Cups are rewarded a right to start in the first period in the following 2022–23 World Cup season.

Results

Europa Cup

Nor-Am Cup

Far East Cup

South American Cup

Australia-New Zealand Cup

References

2021 in alpine skiing
2022 in alpine skiing